Rhinella veraguensis is a species of toad in the family Bufonidae. It is found in the Amazonian versant of the Andes and in the inter-Andean valleys in Bolivia and southeastern Peru. Its natural habitats are montane tropical forests and cloud forests. Breeding takes place in streams. There are no major threats to this common species, although it can locally suffer from habitat loss.

References

veraguensis
Amphibians of the Andes
Amphibians of Bolivia
Amphibians of Peru
Taxa named by Eduard Oscar Schmidt
Amphibians described in 1857
Taxonomy articles created by Polbot